Navneet Singh may refer to:
 Navneet Singh (cricketer)
 Navneet Singh (bowls)